Mohamed Ali Abu El Yazid Shawky (born 5 October 1981) is an Egyptian former professional footballer who played as a defensive midfielder. Between 2001 and 2012, he made 65 appearances scoring 5 goals for the Egypt national team. He played every minute of Egypt's 2006 Africa Cup of Nations campaign.

Club career
Shawky joined Middlesbrough on 31 August 2007 for £650,000 and signed a three-year contract. He made his Boro debut against Tottenham Hotspur on 26 September 2007 in the 3rd round of the 2007–08 League Cup. Shawky played the first half, with the match ending in a 2–0 win for Tottenham. Hampered by injuries during his first season, Shawky played central midfield in Middlesbrough's opening premier league game of the 2008–09 season against Tottenham Hotspur which Middlesbrough won 2–1.

On 8 January 2010, Shawky signed a -year contract with Kayserispor. In June 2010, he and the club ended the contract by mutual consent, allowing Shawky to return to Egypt, joining Al Ahly. After two good seasons with Ahly, he put in a transfer request to leave Ahly in July 2012.

He joined Malaysian Super League club Kelantan FA in 2013. He was released by the club after the season ended. He joined El Mokawloon SC in 2015 that played in Egyptian Premier League

International career
During the 2009 FIFA Confederations Cup, he scored Egypt's second goal against Brazil in the group stage's opening game.

Honours
Egypt
 FIFA World Youth Championship: Bronze Medal 2001
 Africa Cup of Nations: 2006 - 2008

Al Ahly
 FIFA Club World Cup: Bronze Medal 2006
 CAF Champions League: 2005, 2006
 CAF Super Cup: 2006, 2007
 Egyptian Premier League: 2004–05, 2005–06, 2006–07
 Egypt Cup: 2005–06, 2006–07
 Egyptian Super Cup: 2005, 2006, 2007

References

External links
 
 
 

1981 births
Living people
Sportspeople from Port Said
Egyptian footballers
Egypt international footballers
Egyptian expatriate footballers
Expatriate footballers in Turkey
Expatriate footballers in England
Egyptian expatriate sportspeople in Malaysia
Association football midfielders
Egyptian Premier League players
Premier League players
Süper Lig players
Al Masry SC players
Al Ahly SC players
Middlesbrough F.C. players
Kayserispor footballers
Kelantan FA players
Expatriate footballers in Malaysia
2009 FIFA Confederations Cup players
2006 Africa Cup of Nations players
2008 Africa Cup of Nations players
Egyptian expatriate sportspeople in Turkey
Egyptian expatriate sportspeople in England
Egyptian expatriate sportspeople in Iraq
Expatriate footballers in Iraq